Fujian is a province of the People's Republic of China.

Fujian may also refer to:

Places
Fujian Circuit, a circuit or province of the Song dynasty
Fujian Province, Republic of China, a province of the Republic of China

Other uses
Chinese aircraft carrier Fujian
 Type 003 aircraft carrier, the Fujian-class aircraft carrier
Fujian-class tanker

See also

 
 Fijian (disambiguation)
 Fuegians, indigenous natives of Tierra-del-Fuego
 Fu Jian (disambiguation)
 Fuji An (disambiguation)
 Fujianese (disambiguation)
 Jianfu
 Jian (disambiguation) 
 Fu (disambiguation) 
 Hokkien